Francisco 'Fran' José Ochoa Nieto (born 15 November 1989) is a Spanish footballer who plays for CE Mataró as a midfielder.

Football career
Born in Cabra, Córdoba, Andalusia, Ochoa spent his first four years as a senior in the fourth division, with Villarreal CF C and Real Valladolid B. On 12 October 2011, he made his debut for the latter's first team, appearing in a 1–4 away defeat against Celta de Vigo for the season's Copa del Rey.

In July 2012, Ochoa signed with CD Guijuelo in the third division. In the following transfer window, however, he joined fellow league side CD Tenerife.

References

External links

Fran Ochoa at La Preferente

1989 births
Living people
Spanish footballers
Footballers from Andalusia
Association football midfielders
Segunda División B players
Tercera División players
Villarreal CF C players
Real Valladolid Promesas players
Real Valladolid players
CD Guijuelo footballers
CD Tenerife players
Zamora CF footballers
Arandina CF players
Terrassa FC footballers
Palamós CF footballers
UE Vilassar de Mar players
FC Martinenc players
CE Mataró players